The Kingdom of Bahrain consists of Bahrain Island and 33 of the p37 Bahrain Islands, lying in the Persian Gulf's Gulf of Bahrain off the north shore of Asia's Arabian Peninsula. Bahrain's capital city is Manama.

Bahrain Island accounts for about 78% of the kingdom's land area, comprising . The island is surrounded by several of the Middle East's large petroleum fields and commands a strategic position amid the Persian Gulf's shipping lanes.

Geographical setting and islands
Following the return of Janan to Qatar in March 2001, that state of Bahrain consists of 33 natural islands in the  archipelago.

Around most of Bahrain is a relatively shallow inlet of the Persian Gulf known as the Gulf of Bahrain. The seabed adjacent to Bahrain is rocky and, mainly off the northern part of the island, covered by extensive coral reefs. Most of the island is low-lying and barren desert. Outcroppings of limestone form low rolling hills, stubby cliffs, and shallow ravines. The limestone is covered by various densities of saline sand, capable of supporting only the hardiest desert vegetation – chiefly thorn trees and scrub. There is a fertile strip five kilometers wide along the northern coast on which date, almond, fig, and pomegranate trees grow. The interior contains an escarpment that rises to 134 meters, the highest point on the island, to form Jabal al Dukhan (Mountain of Smoke), named for the mists that often wreathe the summit. Most of the country's oil wells are situated in the vicinity of Jabal al Dukhan.

One author writes about the geology of the nation: "Bahrein lies on a portion of the ancient Tethys Ocean geosynclinal belt represented today by the Persian Gulf. The formation of the principal island is the result of pressure from the mountain masses of Persia against the crystalline platform of central Asia, the thrust being absorbed by gentle folding in the geosynclines. The structure of Bahrein is that of a large, single, closed dome covering the entire faulting".

Rocks exposed at the surface consist of:

 Recent sands and coquinas forming flat, raised beaches surrounding the island from which the surface rises gradually to an elevation 150 to 200 feet above sea level. At this point it breaks away into inward-facing cliffs eighty to one hundred feet high completely surrounding an oval central depression about twelve miles long and four wide. 
 Pleistocene sands, cross bedded and probably wind deposited, lying in the canyon. 
 Miocene silicious clay covering a very limited area. 
 Eocene limestone covering most of the island, the central region of which, known as “Jabal Dukhān “Mountain of Smoke”, rises to a point 439 feet above sea level. The limestone is very porous and is the source of most of the water in the northern half of the island.

In addition to Bahrain Island, other islands of significance include Nabih Saleh, which is northwest of Sitrah; Jidda Island and Umm as Sabaan, to the north of Umm an Nasan; and a group of islands, the largest of which is Hawar, near the coast of Qatar. Nabih Saleh contains several freshwater springs that are used to irrigate the island's extensive date palm groves. The rocky islet of Jiddah formerly housed the state prison but has now been converted to a holiday resort. Hawar and the fifteen small islands near it are the subject of a territorial dispute between Bahrain and Qatar. Hawar is nineteen kilometers long and about one and one half kilometers wide. The other islands (such as the Al Garum Islands) are uninhabited and are nesting sites for a variety of migratory birds.

Climate

Bahrain features an arid climate. Bahrain has two seasons: an extremely hot summer and a relatively mild winter. During the summer months, from April to October, afternoon temperatures average  and can reach  during May, June and July. The combination of intense heat and high humidity makes this season uncomfortable. In addition, a hot, dry southwest wind, known locally as the qaws, periodically blows sand clouds across the barren southern end of Bahrain toward Manama in the summer. However, humidity often rises above 90% in the winter. From December to March, prevailing winds from the northwest, known as the shamal, bring damp air over the islands. Regardless of the season, daily temperatures are fairly uniform throughout the archipelago. Note that the coldest temperature ever recorded in Bahrain was on January 20, 1964, when it dropped to -5 °C (23 °F) in Awali and 2.7 °C (36 °F) at Bahrain International Airport.
That particular freeze was accompanied by a white-out, with icicles forming on trees and fences at Awali.

Bahrain receives little precipitation. No permanent rivers or streams exist on any of the islands. The winter rains tend to fall in brief, torrential downpours, flooding the shallow wadis that are dry the rest of the year and impeding transportation. Little of the rainwater is saved for irrigation or drinking. However, there are numerous natural springs in the northern part of Bahrain and on adjacent islands. Underground freshwater deposits also extend beneath the Persian Gulf to the Saudi Arabian coast. Since ancient times, these springs have attracted settlers to the archipelago. Despite increasing salinization, the springs remain an important source of drinking water for Bahrain. Since the early 1980s, however, desalination plants, which render seawater suitable for domestic and industrial use, have provided about 60% of daily water consumption needs.

Area and boundaries
Area: total:780 km2
country comparison to the world: 188
land:780 km2
water: 0 km2

Area comparative
USA - 3.5 times the size of Washington D.C.

Land boundaries: 0 km

Coastline: 161 km

Maritime claims:
territorial sea: 
contiguous zone: 
continental shelf: extending to boundaries to be determined

Elevation extremes:
lowest point: Persian Gulf 0 m
highest point: Jabal ad Dukhan 122 m

Resources and land use

Natural resources: 
 oil, associated and non associated natural gas, fish, pearls

Land use:
arable land: 2.11%
permanent crops: 3.95%
other: 93.95% (2012)

Irrigated land:
40.15 km2 (2003)

Total renewable water resources:
0.12 m³ (2011)

Freshwater withdrawal (domestic/industrial/agricultural):
total: 0.36 km³/yr (50%/6%/45%)
per capita: 386 m³/yr (2003)

Environmental concerns
Natural hazards: 
 periodic droughts; dust storms

Environment - current issues:
desertification resulting from the degradation of limited arable land, periods of drought, and dust storms; coastal degradation (damage to coastlines, coral reefs, and sea vegetation) resulting from oil spills and other discharges from large tankers, oil refineries, and distribution stations; lack of freshwater resources (groundwater and seawater are the only sources for all water needs)

Environment - international agreements:
party to: Biodiversity,  Climate Change-Kyoto Protocol, Desertification, Hazardous Wastes, Law of the Sea, Ozone Layer Protection, Wetlands

See also

Notes

References

Further reading